Lectionary 249, designated by siglum ℓ 249 (in the Gregory-Aland numbering), is a Greek manuscript of the New Testament, on parchment. Palaeographically it has been assigned to the 9th century.
Scrivener labelled it as 191evl.

Description 
The codex contains lessons from the Gospels and Epistles lectionary (Evangelistarium, Apostolarium).
It contains 10 lessons from the Gospel of Matthew, 2 from Mark, 2 from Luke, 3 from John, 5 from Romans, 4 from Corinthians, 1 from Galatians, 1 from Ephesians, and 1 from Hebrews.

The text is written in Greek uncial letters, on 69 parchment leaves, in one column per page, 14-17 lines. It has breathing and accents, no sign of interrogative. Errors of itacism. The nomina sacra are written in an abbreviated way.

History 
It has been assigned by the Institute for New Testament Textual Research to the 9th century.

The manuscript was brought in 1859 by Constantin von Tischendorf, who gave first description of it.

The manuscript was examined and described by Eduard de Muralt.

The manuscript was added to the list of New Testament manuscripts by Scrivener (number 191) and Gregory (number 249).

The manuscript is not cited in the critical editions of the Greek New Testament (UBS3).

The codex is housed at the Russian National Library (Gr.44) in Saint Petersburg.

See also 

 List of New Testament lectionaries
 Biblical manuscript
 Textual criticism
 Lectionary 248

Notes and references

Bibliography 
 Constantine von Tischendorf, Notitia, p. 54
 Eduard de Muralt, Catalogue des manuscrits grecs de la Bibliothèque Impériale publique (Petersburg 1864), p. 24-25 (as XLIV)

Greek New Testament lectionaries
9th-century biblical manuscripts
National Library of Russia collection